The Las Animas Post Office is a historic Modern Movement-style building in Las Animas, Colorado that was built during 1937–38.  It was listed on the National Register of Historic Places in 2008.

It is a  building.  It was unusual for New Deal-era construction in Colorado as it was built as "a direct relief project of the Treasury Department", rather than through the Works Progress Administration or another New Deal construction agency.  It was the first Federal building in Las Animas and has served continuously as its post office.

See also 
List of United States post offices

References 

Post office buildings on the National Register of Historic Places in Colorado
Government buildings completed in 1938
Buildings and structures in Bent County, Colorado
New Deal in Colorado
1938 establishments in Colorado
National Register of Historic Places in Bent County, Colorado